CFMO may refer to:

 Commonwealth Freedom of Movement Organisation, non-profit international organisation
 CKKL-FM, a radio station serving Ottawa, Ontario